Walter Joseph Schmidt (March 20, 1887 in Coal Hill, Arkansas – July 4, 1973 in Modesto, California), was a professional baseball player who played catcher in the Major Leagues from -. He would play for the Pittsburgh Pirates and St. Louis Cardinals. He later was the player/manager of the Mission Bells of the Pacific Coast League during the 1926 season. His brother, Boss Schmidt, also played professional baseball.

In 766 games over 10 seasons, Schmidt posted a .257 batting average (619-for-2411) with 216 runs, 3 home runs, 234 RBI, 57 stolen bases and 137 bases on balls. Defensively, he finished his career with a .980 fielding percentage.

External links

1887 births
1973 deaths
Major League Baseball catchers
Baseball players from Arkansas
Pittsburgh Pirates players
St. Louis Cardinals players
Minor league baseball managers
Helena Hellions players
Winston-Salem Twins players
Roanoke Tigers players
San Francisco Seals (baseball) players
Mission Bells players
Seattle Indians players